Montserrat Cervera Rodon (Barcelona, July 27, 1949) is a Catalan anti-militarist, feminist, and women's health activist, involved in various feminist actions and campaigns such as the right to abortion. She was elected mayor of Loriguilla in 2022.

Biography
Montserrat Cervera Rodon has a degree in Contemporary history from the University of Barcelona, specializing in the oral history of women.

She was a member of the Revolutionary Communist League (LCR) during the years of anti-Francoist struggle through the university movements and the student union. She was imprisoned in Madrid for almost three years following her arrest during the preparation of a demonstration, which is why she was unable to attend the 1976  (Catalan Women's Conference), although she continued to make an impact. She was released in November 1976 and joined a women's committee; since then, she has continued to be linked to feminist movements and the struggle for women's liberation.

The mobilization had a great impact in experiential and political spheres, provoking a crisis in the municipal government and causing the PP to go into opposition.

In 1987, with the DOAN group, Cervera attended the Greenham Common Women's Peace Camp, an important event for the  antimilitarist movement.

She is on the advisory board of the magazine  (MyS).

In June 1922, Cervera was a panelist at a Round Table of the Counter-Summit for Peace organized by the Platform for Peace Against Wars. NATO No Bases Outside. In December 2022, she was named mayor of Loriguilla.

She has a son, and daughter.

References

1949 births
Living people
People from Barcelona
Spanish pacifists
Spanish feminists
Women's health movement
Abortion-rights activists
Catalan women
University of Barcelona alumni